Clonmoyle may refer to:

Places
Clonmoyle East, townland within Aghabullogue, County Cork, Ireland
Clonmoyle West, townland within Aghabullogue, County Cork, Ireland

Other
Clonmoyle House, country house in Clonmoyle East
Clonmoyle Mill, watermill in Clonmoyle East
Clonmoyle Racecourse, racecourse in Clonmoyle West